Ifigenia Martha Martínez y Hernández (born 16 June 1930) is a Mexican economist, diplomat and politician from the Party of the Democratic Revolution (formerly from the Institutional Revolutionary Party). She has served as Deputy of the L, LVI and LXI Legislatures of the Mexican Congress and as Senator of the LIV Legislature representing the Federal District.

Martínez attended the National Autonomous University of Mexico as an undergraduate, studying economics. She earned a master's degree in economics from Harvard. She headed the Faculty of Economics of the National Autonomous University of Mexico from 1966 to 1970.

References

External links
 

1930 births
Living people
Politicians from Mexico City
Women members of the Senate of the Republic (Mexico)
Mexican economists
Mexican women economists
Mexican women diplomats
Members of the Senate of the Republic (Mexico)
Members of the Chamber of Deputies (Mexico)
Members of the Constituent Assembly of Mexico City
Institutional Revolutionary Party politicians
Party of the Democratic Revolution politicians
Labor Party (Mexico) politicians
21st-century Mexican politicians
21st-century Mexican women politicians
Women members of the Chamber of Deputies (Mexico)
National Autonomous University of Mexico alumni
Harvard University alumni
20th-century Mexican politicians
20th-century Mexican women politicians